Public art is art in any media whose form, function and meaning are created for the general public through a public process. It is a specific art genre with its own professional and critical discourse. Public art is visually and physically accessible to the public; it is installed in public space in both outdoor and indoor settings.  Public art seeks to embody public or universal concepts rather than commercial, partisan or personal concepts or interests.  Notably, public art is also the direct or indirect product of a public process of creation, procurement, and/or maintenance.

Independent art created or staged in or near the public realm (for example, graffiti, street art) lacks official or tangible public sanction has not been recognized as part of the public art genre, however this attitude is changing due to the efforts of several street artists.  Such unofficial artwork may exist on private or public property immediately adjacent to the public realm, or in natural settings but, however ubiquitous, it sometimes falls outside the definition of public art by its absence of public process or public sanction as "bona fide" public art.

Characteristics of public art 

Common characteristics of public art are public accessibility, public realm placement, community involvement, public process (including public funding); these works can be permanent or temporary. According to the curator and art/architecture historian, Mary Jane Jacob, public art brings art closer to life.

Public accessibility:  placement in public space/public realm 
Public art is publicly accessible, both physically and/or visually.  When public art is installed on privately owned property, general public access rights still exist.

Public art is characterized by site specificity, where the artwork is "created in response to the place and community in which it resides" and by the relationship between its content and the public. Cher Krause Knight states that "art's publicness rests in the quality and impact of its exchange with audiences ... at its most public, art extends opportunities for community engagement but cannot demand particular conclusion,” it introduces social ideas but leaves room for the public to come to their own conclusions.

Public process, public funding 
Public art is often characterized by community involvement and collaboration. Public artists and organizations often work in conjunction with architects, fabricators/construction workers, community residents and leaders, designers, funding organizations, and others.

Public art is often created and provided within formal "art in public places" programs that can include community arts education and art performance.  Such programs may be financed by government entities through Percent for Art initiatives.

Longevity 
Some public art is planned and designed for stability and permanence. Its placement in, or exposure to, the physical public realm requires both safe and durable materials.  Public artworks are designed to withstand the elements (sun, wind, water) as well as human activity. In the United States, unlike gallery, studio, or museum artworks, which can be transferred or sold, public art is legally protected by the Visual Artists Rights Act of 1990 (VARA) which requires an official deaccession process for sale or removal.

Forms of public art 

The following forms of public art identify to what extent public art may be physically integrated with the immediate context or environment.  These forms, which can overlap, employ different types of public art that suit a particular form of environment integration.

 stand alone:  for example, sculptures, statues, structures
 integrated (into façades, pavements, or landscapes):  for example, bas reliefs, Hill figure, Geoglyph, Petroglyph, mosaics, digital lighting
 applied (to a surface):  for example, murals, building-mounted sculptures
 installation (where artwork and site are mutually embedded):  for example, transit station art
 ephemeral (or non-permanent):  performances, temporary installations:  for example, a precarious rock balance or an instance of colored smoke.

History of public art

United States, 20th century 
In the 1930s, the production of national symbolism implied by 19th century monuments starts being regulated by long-term national programs with propaganda goals (Federal Art Project, United States; Cultural Office, Soviet Union). Programs like President Roosevelt's New Deal facilitated the development of public art during the Great Depression but was wrought with propaganda goals. New Deal art programs were intended to develop national pride in American culture while avoiding addressing the faltering economy. Although problematic, New Deal art programs such as FAP altered the relationship between the artist and society by making art accessible to all people. The New Deal program Art-in-Architecture (A-i-A) developed percent for art programs, a structure for funding public art still utilized today. This program allotted one half of one percent of total construction costs of all government buildings to the purchase of contemporary American art for them.  A-i-A helped solidify the policy that public art in the United States should be truly owned by the public. It also promoted site-specific public art.

The approach to public art radically changed during the 1970s, following the civil rights movement's claims on public space, the alliance between urban regeneration programs and artistic efforts at the end of the 1960s, and revised ideas of sculpture.  Public art acquired a status beyond mere decoration and visualization of official national histories in public space. Public art became much more about the public. This perspective was reinforced in the 1970s by urban cultural policies, for example the New York-based Public Art Fund and urban or regional Percent for Art programs in the United States and Europe. Moreover, public art discourse shifted from a national to a local level, consistent with the site-specific trend and criticism of institutional exhibition spaces emerging in contemporary art practices.

Environmental public art 

Between the 1970s and the 1980s, gentrification and ecological issues surfaced in public art practice both as a commission motive and as a critical focus by artists. The individual, Romantic retreat element implied in the conceptual structure of Land art, and its will to reconnect the urban environment with nature, is turned into a political claim in projects such as Wheatfield – A Confrontation (1982) by American artist Agnes Denes, as well as in Joseph Beuys’ 7000 Oaks (1982). Both projects focus on the increase of ecological awareness through a green urban design process, bringing Denes to plant a two-acre field of wheat in downtown Manhattan and Beuys to plant 7000 oaks coupled with basalt blocks in Kassel, Germany in a guerrilla or community garden fashion. In recent years, programs of green urban regeneration aiming at converting abandoned lots into green areas regularly include public art programs. This is the case for High Line Art, 2009, a commission program for the High Line, derived from the conversion of a portion of railroad in New York City; and of Gleisdreieck, 2012, an urban park derived from the partial conversion of a railway station in Berlin which hosts, since 2012, an open-air contemporary art exhibition.

The 1980s also witnessed the institutionalization of sculpture parks as curated programs. While the first public and private open-air sculpture exhibitions and collections dating back to the 1930s aimed at creating an appropriate setting for large-scale sculptural forms difficult to show in museum galleries, installations such as Noguchi's garden in Queens, New York (1985) reflect the necessity of a permanent relationship between the artwork and its site.

This relationship also develops in Donald Judd’s project for the Chinati Foundation (1986) in Texas, which advocates for the permanent nature of large-scale installations whose fragility may be destroyed when re-locating the work.

Sustainability and public art 
 Public art faces a design challenge by its very nature: how best to activate the images in its surroundings. The concept of “sustainability” arises in response to the perceived environmental deficiencies of a city. Sustainable development, promoted by the United Nations since the 1980s, includes economical, social, and ecological aspects. A sustainable public art work would include plans for urban regeneration and disassembly. Sustainability has been widely adopted in many environmental planning and engineering projects. Sustainable art is a challenge to respond the needs of an opening space in public.

In another public artwork titled "Mission leopard" was commissioned in 2016 in Haryana, India, among the remote deciduous terrain of Tikli village a team coordinated by Artist Hunny Mor painted two leopards perched on branches on a water source tank 115 feet high. The campaign was aimed to spread awareness on co-habitation and environmental conservation. The art work can be seen from several miles across in all directions.

Ron Finley's work as the Gangsta Gardener (or Guerrilla Gardener) of South Central L.A. is an example of an artist whose works constitute temporary public art works in the form of public food gardens that addresses sustainability, food security and food justice.

Andrea Zittel has produced works, such as Indianapolis Island that reference sustainability and permaculture with which participants can actively engage.

Interactive public art 

Some public art is designed to encourage direct hands-on interaction. Examples include public art that contain interactive musical, light, video, or water components.  For example, the architectural centerpiece in front of the Ontario Science Centre is a fountain and musical instrument (hydraulophone) by Steve Mann where people can produce sounds by blocking water jets to force water through sound-producing mechanisms.  An early and unusual interactive public artwork was Jim Pallas' 1980 Century of Light in Detroit, Michigan of a large outdoor mandala of lights that reacted in complex ways to sounds and movements detected by radar (mistakenly destroyed 25 years later). Another example is Rebecca Hackemann's two works The Public Utteraton Machines of 2015 and The Urban Field Glass Project / Visionary Sightseeing Binoculars 2008, 20013, 2021, 2022. The Public Utteraton Machines records people's opinions of other public art in New York, such as Jeff Koon's Split Rocker and displays responses online.

New genre public art 
In the 1990s, some artists called for artistic social intervention in public space. These efforts employed the term "new genre public art" in addition to the terms "contextual art", "relational art", "participatory art", "dialog art", "community-based art", and "activist art". "New genre public art" is defined by Suzanne Lacy as "socially engaged, interactive art for diverse audiences with connections to identity politics and social activism". Mel Chin's Fundred Dollar Bill Project is an example of an interactive, social activist public art project. Rather than metaphorically reflecting social issues, new genre public art strove to explicitly empower marginalized groups while maintaining aesthetic appeal. An example was curator Mary Jane Jacob's 1993 public art show "Culture in Action" that investigated social systems though engagement with audiences that typically did not visit traditional art museums.

Curated public art 

The term "curated public art" is used to define the way of producing public art that significantly takes into account the context, the process and the different actors involved. It defines itself slightly differently from top-down approaches of direct commissioning.

If it mainly designates the fact that a curator conducts and supervises the realization of a public art work for a third party, it can also mean that the art work is produced by a community or public who commissions a work in collaboration with a curator-mediator.

For the first, significant examples of these prospective manners of commissioning art projects have been established by the Public Art Fund launched by Doris C. Freedman in 1977, with a new approach in the way the percent for art was used, or the public art funds of Geneva with the Neon Parallax project involving a very large urban environnement in 2005. 

For the second one can refer to Les Nouveaux Commanditaires launched by Fondation de France with François Hers in 1990 with the idea a project can respond to a community's wish. The New York High Line from 2009 is a good example although less art is involved. The doual'art project in Douala (Cameroon, 1991) is based on a commissioning system that brings together the community, the artist and the commissioning institution for the realization of the project.

Memorial public art 
Memorials for individuals, groups of people or events are sometimes represented through public art. Examples are Maya Lin's Vietnam War Memorial in Washington DC, Tim Tate's AIDS Monument in New Orleans, and Kenzō Tange's Cenotaph for the A-bomb Victims in Hiroshima Peace Memorial Park in Japan.

Controversies 

Public art is sometimes controversial. The following public art controversies have been notable:

Detroit's Heidelberg Project was controversial for several decades since its inception in 1986 due to its garish appearance.
Richard Serra's minimalist piece Tilted Arc was removed from Foley Square in New York City in 1989 after office workers complained their work routine was disrupted by the piece. A public court hearing ruled against continued display of the work.
Victor Pasmore's Apollo Pavilion in the English New Town of Peterlee has been a focus for local politicians and other groups complaining about the governance of the town and allocation of resources. Artists and cultural leaders mounted a campaign to rehabilitate the reputation of the work with the Baltic Centre for Contemporary Art commissioning artists Jane and Louise Wilson to make a video installation about the piece in 2003.
 Sam Durant's Scaffold (2017), installed in the Walker Art Center's garden represented the gallows used in seven government hangings. Native American groups found the work offensive, as 38 Dakota people had been hung at Mankato, Minnesota. The artist agreed to dismantle and permit the tribal elders to burn and bury the piece.
Maurice Agis' Dreamspace V, a huge inflatable maze erected in Chester-le-Street, County Durham, killed two women and seriously injured a three-year-old girl in 2006 when a strong wind broke its moorings and carried it  into the air, with thirty people trapped inside.

Online documentation
Online databases of local and regional public art emerged in the 1990s and 2000s in tandem with the development of web-based data.  Online public art databases can be general or selective (limited to sculptures or murals), and they can be governmental, quasi-governmental, or independent.  Some online databases, such as the Smithsonian American Art Museum's Archives of American Art. It currently holds over six thousand works in its database.

There are dozens of non-government organizations and educational institutions that maintain online public art databases of public artworks covering numerous areas, including the National Endowment for the Arts, WESTAF, Public Art Fund, Creative Time, and others. Public Art Online, maintains a database of public art works, essays and case studies, with a focus on the UK. The Institute for Public Art, based in the UK, maintains information about public art on six continents.

The WikiProject Public art project began in 2009 and strove to document public art around the globe. While this project received initial attention from the academic community, it mainly relied on temporary student contributions.  Its status is currently unknown.

See also

ART/MEDIA
Association for Public Art
Canary Wharf Art Trail, London
Environmental sculpture
List of sculptors
Lock On (street art)
Murals
Plop art
Sculpture trail
Site-specific art
Statue
Street installation
Trompe-l'œil

References

Bibliography
 Cartiere, Cameron, and Martin Zebracki, eds. The Everyday Practice of Public Art: Art, Space, and Social Inclusion. Routledge, 2016.
 Zebracki, Martin.  Public Artopia: Art in Public Space in Question. Amsterdam University Press, 2012.
Chris van Uffelen: 500 x Art in Public: Masterpieces from the Ancient World to the Present. Braun Publishing, 1. Auflage, 2011, 309 S., in Engl. [Mit Bild, Kurzbiografie und kurzer Beschreibung werden 500 Künstler mit je einem Kunstwerk im öffentlichen Raum vorgestellt. Alle Kontinente (außer der Antarktis) und alle Kunststile sind vertreten.]
 Savage, Kirk.  Monument Wars: Washington, DC, the National Mall, and the Transformation of the Memorial Landscape. University of California Press, 2009.
 Powers, John.  Temporary Art and Public Place: Comparing Berlin with Los Angeles.  European University Studies, Peter Lang Publishers, 2009.
Durante, Dianne.  Outdoor Monuments of Manhattan: A Historical Guide. New York University Press, 2007.
Ronald Kunze: Stadt, Umbau, Kunst: Sofas und Badewannen aus Beton in: STADTundRAUM, H., S. 62–65,  2/2006.
Goldstein, Barbara, ed. Public Art by the Book, 2005.
Federica Martini, Public Art in Mobile A2K Methodology guide, 2002.
  (ed.): Public Art. Kunst im öffentlichen Raum, Ostfildern 2001
 Finkelpearl, Tom, ed.  Dialogues in Public Art. MIT Press, 2000.
 Lacy, Susanne, ed.  Mapping the Terrain: New Genre Public Art. Bay Press, 1995.
 Deutsche, Rosalyn.  Evictions: Art and Spatial Politics. MIT Press, 1998.
 Burgin, Victor.  In/Different Spaces: Place and Memory in Visual Culture.  University of California Press, 1996.
 Miles, Malcolm.  Art, Space and the City: Public Art and Urban Futures, 1997.
Academy Group Ltd.  Public Art, Art & Design.  London, 1996
 Doss, Erika Lee.  Spirit Poles and Flying Pigs: Public Art and Cultural Democracy in American Communities.  Smithsonian Books, 1995.
 Senie, Harriet, and Sally Webster, eds.  Critical Issues in Public Art: Content, Context, and Controversy.  Harper Collins, 1992.
 Crimp, Douglas.  On the Museum's Ruins. MIT Press, 1993.
 Miles, Malcolm, et al.  Art For Public Places: Critical Essays, 1989.
 (ed.). Kunst im öffentlichen Raum. Anstöße der 80er Jahre, Köln, 1989
 Love, Suzanne, and Kim Dammers.  The Lansing Area Arts Attitude Survey. Michigan State University Center for Urban Affairs, Lansing, 1978
 Herlyn, Sunke, Manske, Hans-Joachim, and Weisser, Michael (eds.). Kunst im Stadtbild - Von Kunst am Bau zu Kunst im öffentlichen Raum, (catalog for exhibition of the same name, at University of Bremen), Bremen, 1976
 Collection of scholarly publications on public art in Africa

External links

Infecting the City Public Arts Festival
Public Art Archive™
CultureNOW's MuseumWithoutWalls Public Art Database

Public sculpture in Perth Australia
Public sculpture in Cape Town South Africa
Public art in Africa, web dossier compiled by the library of the African Studies Centre, July 2019

 
Types of art museums and galleries